Choronzon  is a demon that originated in writing with the 16th-century occultists Edward Kelley and John Dee within the latter's occult system of Enochian magic. In the 20th century he became an important element within the mystical system of Thelema, founded by Aleister Crowley, where he is the "dweller in the abyss", believed to be the last great obstacle between the adept and enlightenment. Thelemites believe that if he is met with proper preparation, then his function is to destroy the ego, which allows the adept to move beyond the abyss of occult cosmology.

Spelling variations
Including Crowley's spelling of the name, Choronzon, there appear to be three alternatives. Meric Casaubon states that the name is Coronzon (without an 'h') in his True and Faithful Relation…. However, this is at variance with the spelling that appears in John Dee's own journals. Laycock's Enochian Dictionary gives the latter spelling as Coronzom, citing an original manuscript (Cotton XLVI Pt. I, fol. 91a) as the source for the variant. A.D. Mercer's Liber Coronzom discusses the question of spelling in some detail and includes images taken from Dee's original diaries and from Casaubon's True and Faithful Relation... showing the differences.

Choronzon according to Crowley
Otherwise known as "the demon of dispersion", Choronzon is described by Crowley as a temporary personification of the raving and inconsistent forces that occupy the abyss. In this system, Choronzon is given form in evocation only so it may be mastered.

Crowley states that he and Victor Benjamin Neuburg evoked Choronzon in Bou Saâda, Algeria in December 1909. In Crowley's account, it is unclear whether Choronzon was evoked into an empty Solomonic triangle while Crowley sat elsewhere, or whether Crowley himself was the medium into which the demon was invoked. Nearly all writers except Lawrence Sutin take him to mean the latter. In the account, Choronzon is described as changing shape, which is read variably as an account of an actual metamorphosis, a subjective impression of Neuburg's, or fabrication on Crowley's part.

The account describes the demon throwing sand over the triangle to breach it, following which it attacked Neuburg 'in the form of a naked savage', forcing him to drive it back at the point of a dagger. Crowley's account has been criticized as unreliable, as the relevant original pages are torn from the notebook in which the account was written. This, along with other inconsistencies in the manuscript, has led to speculation that Crowley embroidered the event to support his own belief system. Crowley himself claimed, in a footnote to the account in Liber 418, that "(t)he greatest precautions were taken at the time, and have since been yet further fortified, to keep silence concerning the rite of evocation." Arthur Calder-Marshall, meanwhile, asserts in The Magic of my Youth that Neuburg gave a quite different account of the event, claiming that he and Crowley evoked the spirit of "a foreman builder from Ur of the Chaldees", who chose to call himself "P.472". The conversation begins when two British students ask Neuburg about a version of the story in which Crowley turned him into a zebra and sold him to a zoo. Neuburg's response in this book contradicts both the words attributed to him in Liber 418 and the statement of Crowley biographer Lawrence Sutin.

Choronzon is deemed to be held in check by the power of the goddess Babalon, inhabitant of Binah, the third sephirah of the Tree of Life. Both Choronzon and the abyss are discussed in Crowley's Confessions (ch. 66):

"The name of the Dweller in the Abyss is Choronzon, but he is not really an individual. The Abyss is empty of being; it is filled with all possible forms, each equally inane, each therefore evil in the only true sense of the word—that is, meaningless but malignant, in so far as it craves to become real. These forms swirl senselessly into haphazard heaps like dust devils, and each such chance aggregation asserts itself to be an individual and shrieks, "I am I!" though aware all the time that its elements have no true bond; so that the slightest disturbance dissipates the delusion just as a horseman, meeting a dust devil, brings it in showers of sand to the earth."

C.F. Russell, one of Crowley's disciples, went on to found the Choronzon Club, later renamed the GBG.

Choronzon in chaos magic
In much the same way that Satan has been championed by some of those who object to the Abrahamic God, Choronzon has been turned into a positive figure by some iconoclastic occultists, in particular chaos magicians who object to what they see as the stultifying and restrictive dogma of Thelema. Peter Carroll's "Mass of Choronzon" is a ritual with the purpose of casting the energy of one's ego into the universe to effectuate an unknown desire. This, in part, has served as an inspiration for modernized ritual effectuation based on the "333 current".
Carroll himself states in the aforementioned book, however, that Choronzon is simply the name given to the obsessional side-effects of any deluded search for a false Holy Guardian Angel, or anything which the magician would mistake for his own profound genius itself.

In popular culture
An invocation of Choronzon forms the basis for a 1980 episode of Hammer House of Horror entitled "Guardian of the Abyss", in which a cult called The Choronzon Society uses John Dee's scrying mirror to conjure Choronzon.

An experimental multimedia project using the name Choronzon has existed since the late eighties, beginning as two separate and unknown cassette-culture projects, one from the west coast of the United States and the other from the eastern USA. When the internet made each project aware of the other, they fused these into one project. As of 2021, they operate the domain choronzon.org. They have released several albums as well as a printed book, Panic Pandemic. Claiming that what they do is not merely music, but also actual magick acts fused into it, the project's works are distributed through both underground and traditional means. The "demon" Choronzon is cited as an actual member of the project, part of which has centered on extending the mythos around this entity past the Thelemic version of Choronzon into a modernized "post-abyssal" one, presenting Choronzon as an anti-hero and demigod, after becoming a reversed Satan in the form of a "risen demon". It is also Featured as a Recruitble Demon in the Shin Megami Tensei games.

Notes

References

Dee, John, edited by Meric Casaubon. A True and Faithful Relation of What Passed for Many Years Between Dr. John Dee and Some Spirits. Kessinger Publishing. 
Mercer, A. D. Liber Coronzom - An Enochian Grimoire Aeon Sophia Press 2015 
Sutin, Lawrence. Do What Thou Wilt. St. Martin's Griffin, New York.
Thelemapedia. Choronzon.

Demons
Enochian magic
Thelema
New religious movement deities